Chicago High School for the Arts (ChiArts) is a public four–year college preparatory visual and  performing arts high school located in the Humboldt Park neighborhood in Chicago, Illinois, United States. Operated by the Chicago Public Schools district, The school opened for the 2009–10 school year.

History
ChiArts curriculum is combined with intensive training in the performing and visual arts. A public high school open to all Chicago residents, ChiArts opened in the fall of 2009 with 150 freshmen divided among four arts areas: Dance, Music—Instrumental and Vocal, Theatre—divided into Acting and Musical Theatre, and Visual Arts.  The program has added a fifth conservatory in 2014, Creative Writing. ChiArts was previously located at the Douglas school campus for 2009–10 and 2010–11 school years, where ChiArts shared the campus with John J. Pershing West Middle School.  It shared the Doolittle West space at 521 East 35th Street in Bronzeville and the third floor with the James R. Doolittle, Jr. Elementary School next door from 2011 to 2014.

Over the summer of 2014, it moved to its permanent home located at 2714 W. Augusta Blvd, in the Ukrainian Village and Humboldt Park Community. It was scheduled to be in the former Lafayette School, which CPS closed since the number of students was too low.

Program
Students participate in a rigorous program of academics and arts education where they are in school from 8 am until 5 pm, with three of the last hours dedicated to the Arts each child joined.

Admission
Entrance into the school is through a competitive audition and application process. Students may audition for dance (novice and advanced), theatre (acting, musical theatre), visual arts, music (instrumental and voice), and Creative Writing.

History
In 2004, The Elizabeth Morse Charitable Trust and The Elizabeth Morse Genius Charitable Trust convened a group of approximately ten arts and education organizations to discuss the issue of diversity within mid- to large-sized arts organizations in Chicago and specifically the lack of representation in this landscape by professional artists representing the many ethnic communities who call Chicago home.

The Diversity Working Group (DWG) surveyed the Chicago landscape to identify existing educational resources for aspiring young artists across a broad age spectrum, keeping in mind the concentrated, focused training required to prepare young artists for professional careers.  Incredible richness within the existing resources in Chicago's many excellent privately funded community music schools, youth orchestras, university music programs and major cultural institutions was clear.  What was not found was a public institution that would provide a comprehensive learning environment with superior training at the high school level — a critical stage in development for the aspiring young artist.  This age group stood out as the one area of greatest need and also that with greatest potential for positive impact.

Once it was decided to pursue the idea of an arts high school, the group undertook conversations with key senior administrative members from Chicago Public Schools to assess receptivity and possible options for the creation of an exceptional arts-focused educational institution in Chicago.  DWG members conducted site visits and/or spoke to officials at several public and private arts high schools in other cities.

At this time, Renaissance 2010 became an avenue for establishing new schools and offering students and parents a quality choice in education. Civic leaders were identified by the DWG members to help become the executive committee that would lead the project through the application process. The Chicago Board of Education approved the school on October 24, 2007. The executive committee became the founding board of directors of the school. Currently, there are 29 members of the board of directors. In 2008, after year-long competitive national search, the ChiArts board of directors named Jose Ochoa as the founding Executive and artistic director of the school. Instruction began on September 8, 2009.

Partnerships
Numerous community arts programs, professional arts organizations and institutions of higher learning that specialize in the arts have come forward to join with ChiArts in making this type of educational experience available to Chicago residents through the public school system. Arts Partners include: Actors Gymnasium, Albany Park Theatre Project, American Theatre Company, About Face Theatre, Art Institute of Chicago, Art Resources in Teaching, Auditorium Theatre, Black Ensemble Theater, Chicago Arts Partnership in Education (CAPE), Chicago Chamber Musicians, Chicago Children's Choir, Chicago College of Performing Arts/Roosevelt University,  Chicago Multicultural Dance Center, Chicago Sinfonietta, Chicago Shakespeare Theater, Chicago Symphony Orchestra, Chicago Youth Symphony Orchestras, Columbia College Chicago, Congo Square Theatre Company, Dance Works Chicago, DuSable Museum, Ensemble Español Center for Spanish Dance and Music, e Creative Arts Foundation, Goodman Theatre, Harris Theater, The House Theatre of Chicago, Hubbard Street Dance Chicago, Hyde Park Art Center, Hyde Park School of Dance, Hyde Park Suzuki Institute, Joel Hall Dancers & Center, Joffrey Ballet, Lifeline Theatre, Lookingglass Theatre, Lou Conte Dance Studio, Lyric Opera of Chicago, Marwen, Merit School of Music, Midwest Young Artists, Muntu Dance Theatre, Music Institute of Chicago, Music of the Baroque, National Museum of Mexican Art, Natya Dance Theatre, Pegasus Players, People's Music School, Piven Theatre Workshop, Puerto Rican Arts Alliance, Ravinia Festival, Redmoon Theater, Remy Bumppo Theatre Company, River North Chicago Dance Company, Rock for Kids, Ruth Page Foundation, Sherwood Conservatory, Sones de Mexico Ensemble, Steppenwolf Theatre, The Theatre School at DePaul University, Thelonious Monk Institute, Urban Gateways, UIC- College of Architecture and the Arts, UIC- College of Education, VanderCook College of Music, Victory Gardens Theater

Associations
ChiArts is a member of the following organizations:
National Guild of Community Arts Education, Arts Schools NETWORK, Illinois Arts Alliance

References

External links
Chicago High School for the Arts
Chicago Talks
Chicago Reader
Chicago Tribune
Catalyst Chicago
Record Star

Art schools in Illinois
Magnet schools in Illinois
Schools of the performing arts in the United States
Educational institutions established in 2009
Public high schools in Chicago
2009 establishments in Illinois